The 1892 United States presidential election in Missouri took place on November 8, 1892. All contemporary 44 states were part of the 1892 United States presidential election. Voters chose 17 electors to the Electoral College, which selected the president and vice president.

Missouri was won by the Democratic nominees, former President Grover Cleveland of New York and his running mate Adlai Stevenson I of Illinois.

Results

Results by county

See also
 United States presidential elections in Missouri

Notes

References

Missouri
1892
1892 Missouri elections